The Federal Polytechnic, Bali is a federal government higher education institution located in Bali, Taraba State, Nigeria. The current acting Rector is Mohammed Usman.

History 
The Federal Polytechnic, Bali was established in 2007.

Courses 
The institution offers the following courses;

 Office Technology And Management
 Statistics
 Computer Science
 Science Laboratory Technology
 Accountancy
 Agricultural Technology

References 

Federal polytechnics in Nigeria
2007 establishments in Nigeria
Educational institutions established in 2007